Gabriel Alejandro Rosillo Kindelán (born 4 January 1999) is a Cuban Greco-Roman wrestler. He won the gold medal in the 97 kg event at the 2019 Pan American Games held in Lima, Peru.

Career 

In 2018, he won one of the bronze medals in the 97 kg event at the Pan American Wrestling Championships held in Lima, Peru. A year later he went on to win the gold medal in this event.

In March 2020, he qualified to represent Cuba at the 2020 Summer Olympics in Tokyo, Japan at the 2020 Pan American Wrestling Olympic Qualification Tournament held in Ottawa, Canada. A week earlier, he won the silver medal in the 97 kg event at the 2020 Pan American Wrestling Championships, also held in Ottawa, Canada.

He competed in the men's 97 kg event at the 2020 Summer Olympics held in Tokyo, Japan.

Major results

References

External links 
 

Living people
Place of birth missing (living people)
Cuban male sport wrestlers
Pan American Games medalists in wrestling
Pan American Games gold medalists for Cuba
Wrestlers at the 2019 Pan American Games
Medalists at the 2019 Pan American Games
Pan American Wrestling Championships medalists
Wrestlers at the 2020 Summer Olympics
Olympic wrestlers of Cuba
1999 births
20th-century Cuban people
21st-century Cuban people